31st Reconnaissance Squadron may refer to:
 31st Reconnaissance Squadron (Heavy), active from 3 February 1942 to 16 March 1942 and assigned to the 303d Bombardment Group.
 31st Tactical Reconnaissance Squadron, designated the '31st Reconnaissance Squadron (Fighter)' from April 1943 to August 1943
 33d Network Warfare Squadron, designated the '31st Reconnaissance Squadron (Night Photographic)' from September 1947 to November 1947
 31st Test and Evaluation Squadron, designated the '31st Reconnaissance Squadron, Very Long Range (Photographic)' and '31st Reconnaissance Squadron, Very Long Range (Photographic - Radio Countermeasures)' from October 1947 to June 1949

See also
 31st Army Reconnaissance Squadron
 31st Photographic Reconnaissance Squadron
 31st Strategic Reconnaissance Squadron
 31st Tactical Reconnaissance Squadron
 31st Tactical Reconnaissance Training Squadron